Coxcomb Peak is a dolerite elevation which overlooks the south end of Plumstead Valley in the Allan Hills, Victoria Land. It was reconnoitered by the New Zealand Antarctic Research Program Allan Hills Expedition (1964) who gave the name because of the jaunty appearance of the feature in profile.

References
 

Mountains of Oates Land